HMSA may refer to
 Hawthorne Math and Science Academy, a school in Hawthorne, California, USA
 Hawaii Medical Service Association